Turtsevo is a rural locality (a village) in Ramenskoye Rural Settlement, Sheksninsky District, Vologda Oblast, Russia. The population was 4 as of 2002.

Geography 
Turtsevo is located 47 km north of Sheksna (the district's administrative centre) by road. Filyakovo is the nearest rural locality.

References 

Rural localities in Sheksninsky District